Iru Thuruvam also transliterated as Iru Dhuruvam, is a 1971 Indian Tamil-language crime drama film, produced by P. S. Veerappa and directed by S. Ramanathan. The film stars Sivaji Ganesan, Padmini and Muthuraman, with Nagesh and Sundarrajan in supporting roles. It is a remake of the 1961 Hindi film Gunga Jumna, and revolves around two brothers who end up on opposite sides of the law. The film was released on 14 January 1971, and failed commercially.

Plot 
Brothers Rangan and Durai, grow up with a single mother taking care of them. Rangan wants Durai to become a cop. He works hard allowing Durai only to study and not do any other work in the house or in the village. Life takes a cruel turn when Durai goes for training with Naganathan, the evil zamindar, turning Rangan into a dacoit and criminal. When Durai comes back, he falls in love with Kamal who is Naganathan's daughter to complicate matters. In the end, Naganathan is arrested while Rangan dies bringing him to justice.

Cast

Soundtrack 
The music was composed by M. S. Viswanathan.

Release 
Iru Thuruvam was released on 14 January 1971, and failed commercially.

References

External links 
 

1970s Tamil-language films
1971 crime drama films
1971 films
Films about brothers
Films about outlaws
Films scored by M. S. Viswanathan
Indian crime drama films
Tamil remakes of Hindi films